Rahamatulla Molla (born 30 March 1987) is an Indian former athlete.

He won a bronze medal as a member of India's 4 x 100 metres relay team at the 2010 Commonwealth Games, which set a national record in the final.

At the 2010 Asian Games he was fourth in the 4 × 100 metres relay, but the result was annulled when it was revealed that teammate Suresh Sathya had tested positive for nandrolone prior to the games.

Personal life 
Rahamatulla, the son of a carpenter, is one of six siblings from a Muslim family in West Bengal. He lives in Daqaitmara village which is 60 km away from Kolkata. He has got four brothers and one sister.

Rahamatulla was a police constable in Kolkata.

References

External links
Rahamatulla Molla at the IAAF

1987 births
Living people
Indian male sprinters
Athletes (track and field) at the 2010 Asian Games
Athletes (track and field) at the 2010 Commonwealth Games
Commonwealth Games bronze medallists for India
Commonwealth Games medallists in athletics
Indian Muslims
Athletes from West Bengal
Asian Games competitors for India
Medallists at the 2010 Commonwealth Games